The  is a river in the Kii Peninsula of central Japan, located in Nara, Wakayama and Mie Prefectures.

The river rises from Mount Ōmine in the Yoshino-Kumano National Park in Tenkawa, Nara and follows a generally southward course to drain into the Pacific Ocean on the border between Shingū, Wakayama and Kihō, Mie. The river is part of the Sacred Sites and Pilgrimage Routes in the Kii Mountain Range, a UNESCO World Heritage Site which incorporates nature scenery of the Kii peninsula with numerous Buddhist temples and Shinto shrines forming a pilgrimage route.

Municipalities through which the river passes are:
Nara Prefecture
Tenkawa, Nara
Gojō, Nara
Totsukawa, Nara
Wakayama Prefecture
Tanabe, Wakayama
Shingū, Wakayama
Mie Prefecture
Kumano, Mie
Kihō, Mie

References

Notes

 

Rivers of Nara Prefecture
Rivers of Mie Prefecture
Rivers of Wakayama Prefecture
Rivers of Japan